Sang Charak or Sang-e Charak may refer to:
Sangcharak District, Afghanistan
Sang-e Charak, Fars, Iran
Sang Charak, Kerman, Iran